Anthyllis cytisoides is a summer-deciduous shrub of Southern Europe, common in the Balearic Islands and the southeastern coast of the Iberian Peninsula. It prefers semi-arid limestone soils in areas free of frost the year round.

References

External links
 Picture
 Spatial Pattern in Anthyllis cytisoides Shrubland on Abandoned Land in Southeastern Spain

cytisoides
Plants described in 1753
Taxa named by Carl Linnaeus